Erick Roberto Miranda Chonay (born 17 December 1971) is a retired Guatemalan football defender who has played most of his career for CSD Comunicaciones of the Guatemalan premier division.

He has been part of the Guatemala national team set-up for over 10 years.

Club career
Central defender Miranda has spent the majority of his career playing at local giants Comunicaciones where he has been club captain. He also had a spell at Heredia in the 2004/2005 season but returned to the Cremas in January 2006 for a short, second, spell before moving to second division side Deportivo Mixco. In September 2007 he joined fellow second division team Sanarate and in March 2009 Deportivo San Pedro were looking to acquiring his services.

International career
A national team stalwart for over 10 years, Miranda made his debut for Guatemala in a May 1991 UNCAF Nations Cup match against Honduras and has earned a total of 69 caps, scoring 2 goals. He has represented his country in 19 FIFA World Cup qualification matches and played at 5 UNCAF Nations Cups as well as at 4 CONCACAF Gold Cups.

His final international was a May 2001 UNCAF Nations Cup match against Costa Rica.

International goals
Scores and results list Guatemala's goal tally first.

Retirement
In 2010 Miranda is Football Instructor at the Ministry of Sport and Recreation.

References

External links

1971 births
Living people
People from Escuintla Department
Guatemalan footballers
Guatemala international footballers
1991 CONCACAF Gold Cup players
1996 CONCACAF Gold Cup players
1998 CONCACAF Gold Cup players
2000 CONCACAF Gold Cup players
2001 UNCAF Nations Cup players
Comunicaciones F.C. players
Copa Centroamericana-winning players
Association football defenders